The 2021 Idaho Vandals football team represented the University of Idaho in the Big Sky Conference during the 2021 NCAA Division I FCS football season. Led by ninth-year head coach Paul Petrino, the Vandals were 4–7 (3–5 in Big Sky, ninth), and played their home games on campus at the Kibbie Dome in Moscow, Idaho. 

Previous season 

The Vandals finished the 2020–21 season at 2–4 (2–4 in Big Sky, tied for fifth).

Preseason

Polls
On July 26, 2021, during the virtual Big Sky Kickoff, the Vandals were predicted to finish eighth in the Big Sky by both the coaches and media.

Preseason All–Big Sky team
The Vandals had two players selected to the preseason all-Big Sky team.

Offense

Logan Kendall – FB

Defense

Tre Walker – MLB

Schedule

Game summaries

Simon Fraser

at Indiana

at Oregon State

at No. 8 UC Davis

Portland State

at No. 2 Eastern Washington

No. 11 Montana

Northern Arizona

Southern Utah

at No. 3 Montana State

at Idaho State

References

Idaho
Idaho Vandals football seasons
Idaho Vandals football